The lightweight was the median boxing weight class held as part of the Boxing at the 1904 Summer Olympics programme. It was the first time the event, like all other boxing events, was held in Olympic competition. Lightweights had to be less than 61.2 kilograms. Eight boxers competed.

Results

1 A well-known local boxer, Carroll Burton, entered the tournament and originally won this bout against Sturholdt. However, officials later discovered that the winner was actually an impostor named James Bollinger; Bollinger was ejected from the competition and Sturholdt was advanced to the next round.

2 Egan won the bout on walkover as Lydon was injured.

3 Jack Egan originally won the silver medal in the lightweight competition and the bronze medal in the welterweight competition. Later, it was discovered that his real name was Frank Joseph Floyd, whereas AAU rules made it illegal to fight under an assumed name. In November 1905, the AAU disqualified Egan from all AAU competitions and ordered him to return all his prizes and medals. Russell van Horn was awarded the silver and Peter Sturholdt awarded the bronze in the lightweight competition while Joseph Lydon retained bronze in the welterweight competition.

References

Sources
 
 November 1905 AAU disqualification of Egan
 IOC's medal database for event at 1904 Olympics

Lightweight